Disenå Station is located in Disenå in Sør-Odal, Norway on the Kongsvinger Line. The station was built in 1862 as part of Kongsvingerbanen. The station was served five times daily Oslo Commuter Rail line 460 operated by the Norwegian State Railways until it was closed down in December 2012.

References

External links
 Norwegian National Rail Administration's page on Disenå

Railway stations in Hedmark
Railway stations on the Kongsvinger Line
Railway stations opened in 1862
1862 establishments in Norway